YG and variants may refer to:

Arts and entertainment 
 YG Entertainment, a Korean entertainment company
 Yang Hyun-suk, a Korean rapper and the founder of YG Entertainment
 Young Guns (band), an alternative rock band from Buckinghamshire, United Kingdom
 YG (rapper) (born 1990), a rapper from Compton, California, United States

Others
 Young Greens (disambiguation), one of several youth wings of Green parties (or members thereof)
 Yoctogram (yg), an SI unit of mass
 Yottagram (Yg), an SI unit of mass